Ardisia zakii is a species of plant in the family Primulaceae. It is endemic to Ecuador.  It is threatened by habitat loss.

References

Endemic flora of Ecuador
zakii
Vulnerable plants
Taxonomy articles created by Polbot